Gemmula denticula is an extinct species of sea snail, a marine gastropod mollusk in the family Turridae, the turrids.

Distribution
Fossils of this species were found in Miocene strata in Aquitaine, France and in Hungary.

References

External links
 Kovács, Z.; Vicián, Z. (2021). Middle Miocene Conoidea (Neogastropoda) assemblage of Letkés (Hungary), Part II. (Borsoniidae, Cochlespiridae, Clavatulidae, Turridae, Fusiturridae). Földtani Közlöny. 151(2): 137–158
 Fossilshels: Turris denticula

denticula
Gastropods described in 1825